Franz Kröwerath (30 June 1880 – 25 December 1945) was a German rower who competed in the 1900 Summer Olympics. He was the coxswain of the German boat Ludwigshafener Ruder Verein, which won the bronze medal in the coxed four final B.

References

External links

 

1880 births
1945 deaths
Coxswains (rowing)
Olympic rowers of Germany
Rowers at the 1900 Summer Olympics
Olympic bronze medalists for Germany
Olympic medalists in rowing
German male rowers
Medalists at the 1900 Summer Olympics
Place of birth missing
Place of death missing